Sørfolda is a fjord in Nordland county, Norway. It is located in the municipalities of Sørfold and Bodø. The  Sørfolda is a southeastern branch of the main Folda fjord. Side branches include the Nevelsfjorden, Eidekjosen, Skjunkfjorden, and Leirfjorden.

The village of Straumen is located at the innermost end of the Sørfolda.  The village of Røsvika sits on the western shore of the fjord, about halfway along the fjord.  The European route E06 runs along parts of the eastern shore of the fjord.

See also
 List of Norwegian fjords

References

Fjords of Nordland
Bodø
Sørfold